Sunetra Arun Paranjpe (born 9 May 1980) is an Indian former cricketer and current cricket coach. She played as a right-handed batter, right-arm medium bowler and occasional wicket-keeper. She appeared in three Test matches and 28 One Day Internationals for India between 2002 and 2007. She played domestic cricket for Mumbai, Railways and Gujarat.

In February 2021 she was appointed as head coach of Baroda Women. She was also head coach of Trailblazers for the 2022 Women's T20 Challenge.

References

External links
 
 

Living people
1980 births
Cricketers from Mumbai
Indian women cricketers
India women Test cricketers
India women One Day International cricketers
Mumbai women cricketers
Railways women cricketers
Gujarat women cricketers
West Zone women cricketers
Central Zone women cricketers
Indian cricket coaches